Eurydice was launched in 1797. She made one voyage for the British East India Company (EIC). She then spent the rest of her career primarily as a West Indiaman, though with voyages elsewhere as well. Her last voyage appears to have been to India under a license from the EIC. She is no longer listed in the registries after 1820.

Career
Eurydice was launched at Chester in 1797. She enters Lloyd's Register in 1797 with Muirhead, master, St Barbe, owner, and trade Liverpool–Bengal.

Captain Alexander Muirhead acquired a letter of marque on 7 April 1797. He sailed from Portsmouth on 1 July, bound for Bengal. Eurydice reached the Cape of Good Hope on 17 December and arrived at Calcutta on 16 April 1798. Homeward bound, she was at Kedgeree on 23 January 1799. She reached St Helena on 13 February and Crookhaven on 8 April. She arrived at Deptford on 19 April.

Even before Eurydice had returned from Bengal, St Barbe had sold her. Lloyd's Register for 1799 has the following entry:

 
Captain Thomas Roach received a letter of marque on 24 August 1799. When Captain Charles Spencer Compton replaced Roach, Compton acquired three letters of marque: 17 September 1800, 1 July 1807, and 5 May 1809.  

On 22 July 1806, Lloyd's List reported that Arethusa, Chivers, master, had been condemned at Surinam and that Eurydice, Compton, master, would carry her cargo back to England.

On 24 February 1809, Lloyd's List reported that Eurydice, Compton, master, had arrived at London from Surinam, having sailed from there on 13 January. She had parted on the 17th from the other vessels with whom she had left Surinam. She then ran into bad weather and had to throw her guns and 90 bags of coffee overboard to lighten her.

Fate
Lloyd's Register and the Register of Shipping both last listed Eurydice in 1820.

Citations and references
Citations

References

1797 ships
Age of Sail merchant ships of England
Ships of the British East India Company